Sequel is the ninth studio album by the American singer-songwriter Harry Chapin, released in 1980 (see 1980 in music). It was the last complete album released during Harry's lifetime.  A tenth studio album, The Last Protest Singer, made up of material he was working on at the time of his death, was released about six years after he died.

The title song "Sequel" reports further events in the lives of Harry and Sue, the characters in Chapin's hit song "Taxi", and peaked at  23 on the Billboard Hot 100 chart (the original went to No. 24). A follow-up single, "Story of a Life", failed to reach the Hot 100 chart (peaking at No. 105), but is historic as it was Chapin's final 45.

The album was later re-released under the title Remember When the Music with the addition of two previously unreleased tracks.  It was re-released with only the original ten tracks as Storyteller in 1999. It was also remastered in 2001 with four additional tracks.

Track listing

Tracks 7–10 on side two are bonus tracks on the 2001 remastered edition

Charts

Personnel
Harry Chapin – guitar, vocals
Howard Albert – synthesizer
Yvonne Cable – cello
Charles Chalmers – vocals
Sandra Chalmers – vocals
Steve Chapin – piano, vocals
Tom Chapin – banjo, guitar
Howie Fields – drums
Chuck Kirkpatrick – vocals, electric guitar
Joe Lala – percussion
Donna Rhodes – vocals
Doug Walker – electric guitar
John Wallace – bass guitar, vocals

References

Harry Chapin albums
1980 albums